Philip Sidney, 5th Earl of Leicester (8 July 1676 – 24 July 1705) was a British peer and Member of Parliament for Kent, styled Viscount Lisle from 1698 to 1702.

He inherited the earldom from Robert Sidney, 4th Earl of Leicester and was succeeded by his brother John Sidney, 6th Earl of Leicester. There is a memorial to him at St John the Baptist, Penshurst.

References
http://thepeerage.com/p2947.htm#i29462

1676 births
1705 deaths
5th Earl of Leicester
Sidney, Philip
Philip